Harry Alden Richardson (January 1, 1853 – June 16, 1928) was an American businessman and politician from Dover, in Kent County, Delaware. He was a member of the Republican Party, and was U.S. Senator from Delaware.

Early life and family
Richardson was born in Camden, Delaware, the son of Alden B. Richardson and Lucy R. Richardson. His family moved to Dover, Delaware when he was a small child in 1858. He attended the common schools there and the Kent Academy in East Greenwich, Rhode Island. In 1876 he married Priscilla Walker. They were members of the Baptist Church.

Professional and political career
Richardson worked in his father's canning and packing business in Dover, eventually becoming a partner and assuming control in 1894. He continued in this business throughout his life, was President of the First National Bank of Dover, and was also interested in various public-service corporations.

In his first attempt at public office, he ran for the office of Governor of Delaware in 1890, but lost to Democrat Robert J. Reynolds. Then, many years later, in 1907, he was elected to the U.S. Senate. During this term, he served with the Republican majority in the 60th, 61st, and 62nd U.S. Congress. In the 61st Congress, he was Chairman of the Committee to Examine Branches of the Civil Service, and in the 62nd Congress he was Chairman of the Committee on Pacific Islands and Puerto Rico, and a member of the Committee on Printing. He did not seek reelection in 1913, and in all, served from March 4, 1907, to March 4, 1913, during the administrations of U.S. Presidents Theodore Roosevelt and William H. Taft.

Death and legacy
Richardson died at Dover is buried there in the Lakeside Methodist Episcopal Cemetery.

Ancestry
Richardson is a direct descendant of Major General Humphrey Atherton.

Almanac
The General Assembly chose the U.S. Senators, who took office March 4 for a six-year term.

Biography

Images
Biographical Directory of the U.S. Congress

External links
Biographical Directory of the U.S. Congress
Delaware’s Members of Congress

The Political Graveyard

References

|-

1853 births
1928 deaths
Baptists from Delaware
People from Dover, Delaware
Delaware Republicans
Burials in Dover, Delaware
Republican Party United States senators from Delaware
People from Camden, Delaware
19th-century Baptists